Mount Cameron may refer to:

 Mount Cameron (Alaska), in the Chugach Mountains
 Mount Cameron (Antarctica)
 Mount Cameron, Colorado, a mountain peak in Colorado, United States
 Mount Cameron (Hong Kong), a hill in Hong Kong
 Mount Cameron (Washington), a mountain in Olympic National Park, US

See also
 Mount Cameroon, in Cameroon